Marc Lanteigne (Chinese: 兰马克; born 1971) is a Canadian political scientist originally from Montréal. He is Associate Professor of Political Science at the Arctic University of Norway, Tromsø, teaching international relations (IR), comparative politics, security studies and comparative political economy. Prior to that, Lanteigne was a Senior Research Associate at Department of East Asian Studies, Ruhr University Bochum, and Senior Lecturer at the Centre for Defence and Security Studies (CDSS) at Massey University in Auckland. He is Editor-in-Chief of an Arctic news website Over the Circle, a part-time lecturer at Peking University, an adjunct researcher at the Centre for Arctic Studies at the University of Iceland, Reykjavík, and a member of the board of the UK-based Polar Research and Policy Initiative (PRPI).

Academic career 
Lanteigne received his MA and PhD from the McGill University in 1994 and 2002. He researches in and writes about China’s regional and international relations, including a textbook entitled Chinese Foreign Policy: An Introduction, as well as economic security, free trade politics, and energy issues. He writes for The New Humanitarian and Institute for Security & Development Policy. He is the co-editor of the Routledge Handbook of Arctic Security, Nordic-China Diplomacy, and China’s Evolving Approach to Peacekeeping.

Between September 2014 and October 2016, Lanteigne was Senior Research Fellow at the Norwegian Institute of International Affairs (NUPI), researching Chinese and comparative Northeast Asian politics and foreign policy, as well as Asia-Arctic relations, international political economy and institution-building. He has previously taught at Dalhousie University, Halifax, Canada (2002-2004), the McGill University (2004-2006), the University of St. Andrews, Scotland (2006-2010) and Victoria University of Wellington, New Zealand (2010-2014).

Works

Monographs
 China and International Institutions: Alternate Paths to Global Power (2005)
 Chinese Foreign Policy: An Introduction  (2009, 2013, 2015, 2019)

Edited books
The Chinese Party-State in the 21st Century: Adaptation and the Reinvention of Legitimacy (2008) with André Laliberté
China’s Evolving Approach to Peacekeeping (2014) with Miwa Hirono
Nordic-China Diplomacy (2017) with Wrenn Yennie Lindgren and Bjørnar Sverdrup-Thygeson
 Routledge Handbook of Arctic Security (2022)

References

Living people
Canadian political scientists
21st-century Canadian non-fiction writers
Year of birth missing (living people)